"That Thing You Do" is the titular song appearing in the 1996 film of the same name. Written by Adam Schlesinger, the song is performed by the fictional 1960s band The Wonders, who are the focus of the film. The song peaked at No. 41 on the Billboard Hot 100 and was nominated for an Academy Award and a Golden Globe Award for Best Original Song in 1997.

In the film
In 1964, an Erie, Pennsylvania, band named "The Oneders" (later known as The Wonders) goes from a college talent show to climbing up the Billboard charts thanks to the song "That Thing You Do". Written by guitarist/vocalist Jimmy Mattingly II, it was originally crafted as a ballad. During the performance at the talent show, drummer Guy Patterson produces a much more up-tempo beat and the rest of the band follow suit, turning the song into an upbeat, Beatles-esque rock number. The song is a hit with the audience, and they win the talent show. From there, the band is picked up by a local manager who helps them get more shows in the area, and eventually the song receives radio airplay. The band is then signed to Play-Tone Records, under Mr. White's guidance, and the song climbs up the Billboard Hot 100, starting at number 93, then 71, 49, and 21. The following week, "That Thing You Do" climbs to number 7, becoming the quickest-charting song ever on Play-Tone Records. However, Jimmy walks out on the band before they can produce another record, so they eventually become one-hit wonders.

Early in the film, when Jimmy and Lenny are asking Guy to join them at the talent competition at the college, Jimmy mentions they'll perform a song he wrote. Lenny takes offense to that by slapping Jimmy on the arm. Jimmy begrudgingly corrects himself by saying, "We wrote." Later, when the vinyl 45 is officially released, the label states: Written by James Mattingly II. Later still, when being interviewed live on radio station KJZZ, Jimmy says of the song, "We wrote it in my garage back in Erie, Pennsylvania."

In the film, the song is performed by James "Jimmy" Mattingly II on lead vocals and guitar, Leonard "Lenny" Haise on lead guitar and backing vocals, "T.B. Player" on bass and backing vocals, and Guy "Shades" Patterson on drums. For their live performance of the song on The Hollywood Television Showcase, studio bassist Scott "Wolfman" Pell replaced T.B. Player on bass and backing vocals.

In the fictitious "mockumentary" liner notes from the soundtrack CD, "That Thing You Do" peaked at number 2 on the Billboard Hot 100 during the summer of 1964.

In reality
The song was written by Adam Schlesinger, the bassist of the alternative rock group Fountains of Wayne. Schlesinger did not expect his song to be chosen, but tried as "a personal exercise." Performers include Mike Viola on vocals with Schlesinger on backup vocals.

The song was released as a single, and although not as successful as was depicted in the film, the track still did moderately well in the US, peaking for three weeks at number 41 on the Billboard Hot 100 in November of 1996. (It also reached number 22 on the Adult Contemporary chart, number 18 on the Adult Top 40, and number 24 on the Top 40 Mainstream chart.) The song also reached number 50 in Australia.

The song was a bigger hit outside of the US, reaching number 31 in Canada in December 1996, and number 22 on the UK Singles Chart in February 1997. The song was nominated for Best Original Song at the 69th Academy Awards as well as Best Original Song at the 54th Golden Globe Awards, losing out on both occasions to Madonna's "You Must Love Me" (written by Tim Rice and Andrew Lloyd Webber) from the musical Evita.

On April 25, 2017, three quarters of the actors who played The Wonders—Tom Everett Scott (Guy "Shades" Patterson), Johnathon Schaech (Jimmy Mattingly II) and Ethan Embry ("T.B. Player")—performed the song live during a surprise appearance at the Roxy in Los Angeles. The occasion was the Goddamn Comedy Jam, a live show series in which comedians tell funny stories about a meaningful song and then perform it with a live band. Comedian and show creator Josh Adam Meyers persuaded the actors to perform the song with him. After initial hesitation on Scott's part, Meyers managed to persuade him with help from The After Jam producer Jason Gallagher, who happened to be Scott's brother-in-law. The other actors soon followed suit, with Gallagher helping them learn how to play the instruments. Steve Zahn (Lenny Haise) was unable to participate due to living in Kentucky; comedian Jeremiah Watkins took his place on lead guitar while wearing a cut-out mask of Zahn's face. On April 10, 2017, Embry posted a video of himself playing the song's bass line; it is now apparent that the video was a teaser for the event two weeks later.

Charts

Cover versions
 The Knack recorded the song for their 1998 hits collection, Proof: The Very Best of the Knack.
 'N Sync performed the song during their 1999 tour, as part of a '60s segment.
 New Found Glory did a cover of this song for their EP, From the Screen to Your Stereo in 2000.
 Brennan Hillard covered the song in 2003 as a semifinalist on American Juniors, performing it in a higher key because he was a boy tenor at the time.
 Japanese ska band Shaka Labbits included a cover of the song on their 2004 live album Burning Cylinder.
 Scottish band Bubblegum Lemonade included the song on their 2008 EP Ten Years Younger.
 In 2010, the song was parodied by The Fringemunks to recap Fringe episode 3.03, "The Plateau."
 Day6's Jae Park performed it on the South Korean reality show K-pop Star in 2012.
 Pentatonix performed the song at the 2014 Kennedy Center Honors, paying tribute to Tom Hanks, the writer and director of the song's feature film by the same name.
Set It Off used the beat as inspiration for their song "Ancient History."
Cheekface recorded a cover of the song for the Adam Schlesinger tribute album Saving for a Custom Van in 2020.
Billie Joe Armstrong of Green Day released a cover version of the song to YouTube in 2020.
REO Brothers recorded a cover in July 2020 on YouTube.
The Weeklings perform it on their live album, "In Their on Write" on JEM Records. It also appears on their "Live If You Want It" live stream released on YouTube in 2020.
The Erie, Pennsylvania band First to Eleven covered the song in February 2022.

Notes

References

1996 songs
1996 singles
American power pop songs
Epic Records singles
Songs written for films
Songs written by Adam Schlesinger
The Knack songs